CSN may refer to:

Companies 
 CSN Stores, former name of Wayfair, American e-commerce company
 CSN International (Christian Satellite Network), religious radio broadcaster based on radio station KAWZ in Twin Falls, Idaho
 Centrala Studiestödsnämnden, Swedish national student loans and grants authority
 Columbus Sports Network (WCSN-LD), low-power television station in Columbus, Ohio
 Comcast SportsNet, former name of NBC Sports Regional Networks
 Comic Shop News, free weekly newspaper distributed throughout comic book specialty stores
 Companhia Siderúrgica Nacional, Brazilian steel maker

Music 
 Crosby, Stills & Nash
 CSN (album), an album from the above
 CSN (box set), a box set from the above

Transport
 CSN, National Rail station code for Chessington North railway station, England
 Changsha South railway station, China Railway pinyin code CSN
 China Southern Airlines, China

Other uses
 Cell Signaling Networks
 COP9 signalosome (CSN), a protein complex
 CSN2
 COP9 signalosome complex subunit 3 (CSN3)
 Coláiste an Spioraid Naoimh, a secondary school in Cork City, Ireland
 College of Southern Nevada, a community college located in Clark County
 Comunidad Sudamericana de Naciones, Union of South American Nations
 CSN.1, Concrete Syntax Notation, a telecommunications and computer networking standard
 Confederate States Navy
 Confédération des syndicats nationaux
 Carlton Sports Network, a sports channel in Sri Lanka
 Czech technical standard (ČSN)